UDX may refer to:
 Utility Dog Excellent, a dog obedience title
 United Artists Records
UDX Frame
UDX Theater, venue for Seiyu Awards, Japan
UDX, station code for Urdauli on List of railway stations in India